The Jersey Electricity Company or Jersey Electricity (informally JEC or JE) is a public limited company, and the sole provider for electricity in Jersey. The JEC has two sites around the island: Queen's Road, St Helier, the site of two Rolls-Royce Olympus gas turbines and La Collette Power Station where there are five Sulzer Diesel turbines, one Rolls-Royce Olympus turbine, and three Parsons steam turbines.

History
The Jersey Electricity Company was founded in April 1924, with a small generating station at the end of Albert Pier. Within a decade it had moved to a new, bigger power station at Queen's Road, the site of today's Powerhouse retail park and administration offices.

By the 1960s, increased demand for electricity meant a move to an even bigger station. The company was listed on the London Stock Exchange to raise capital for the building of La Collette Power Station that served the island for over 50 years. Today, La Collette is the controlling hub of a transmission network that includes three multi-million-pound undersea supply cables that import 95% as low-carbon power from France. Its generating plant is maintained for emergency back-up only as Jersey now benefits from a decarbonised electricity supply. The security of this supply has been called into question, however, after recent threats by the French government relating to retaliation over fishing rights.

Group
The JEC group includes many varied businesses including JE Building Services, Jendev, Channel Islands Electricity Grid a joint-venture, Jersey Energy, Foreshore, Jersey Deep Freeze Ltd, Jersey Electricity Retail, Phone Factory, Beyond Computers, Imagination.

Retail
The group also own a retail store, called The Powerhouse. The store sells home appliances, technology products and toys.

In 2014, half of the store was let to Sports Direct.

See also
La Collette Power Station
Guernsey Electricity

References

External links
 

Electric power companies of Jersey
Energy companies established in 1924
1924 establishments in Jersey